"The Talking Stone" is a science fiction mystery short story by American writer Isaac Asimov, which first appeared in the October 1955 issue of The Magazine of Fantasy and Science Fiction and was reprinted in the 1968 collection Asimov's Mysteries.  "The Talking Stone" was the second of Asimov's Wendell Urth stories.

Plot summary

Larry Verdansky, a repair technician assigned alone on Station Five, is interested in "siliconies", the silicon-based life forms found on some asteroids. Some are telepathic.

When the space freighter Robert Q appears at the station with a giant of a "silicony"  in diameter, Verdansky deduces that the crew has found an incredibly rich source of uranium. Verdansky contacts the authorities, but before a patrol ship can reach her, the Robert Q is hit by a meteor, killing the three human crew members. The silicony itself is fatally injured from the explosive decompression.

When questioned, the dying silicony states that the coordinates of its home are written on "the asteroid". Dr. Wendell Urth deduces that the silicony meant that the numbers were actually engraved on the hull of the Robert Q, disguised as serial and registration numbers, since the ship fit the definition of an asteroid (a small body orbiting the Sun) the ship's crew had read to it from an ancient astronomy book.

References

External links
 

Short stories by Isaac Asimov
1955 short stories
Science fiction short stories
Works originally published in The Magazine of Fantasy & Science Fiction
Silicon
Biochemistry literature